Thysbina is a genus of leaf beetles in the subfamily Eumolpinae. It is known from Africa. It was first established by the German entomologist Julius Weise in 1902, for several species from Colasposoma as well as three new species.

Species
 Thysbina amata (J. Thomson, 1858)
 Thysbina antiqua (Harold, 1879)
 Thysbina bicostata Weise, 1902
 Thysbina fallax Weise, 1902
 Thysbina femoralis (Lefèvre, 1877)
 Thysbina lefevrei (Baly, 1881)
 Thysbina pleuralis Weise, 1915
 Thysbina rufipes Weise, 1902
 Thysbina viridimarginata (Jacoby, 1894)

Species moved to Ennodius:
 Thysbina caerulea Pic, 1952
 Thysbina gabonica Pic, 1952: synonym of Ennodius murrayi (Chapuis, 1874)

Species moved to Timentes:
 Thysbina camerunensis Pic, 1953

References

Eumolpinae
Chrysomelidae genera
Beetles of Africa
Taxa named by Julius Weise